The 10th FINA Synchronised Swimming World Cup was held September 12–15, 2002 in Zurich, Switzerland. It featured swimmers from 12 nations, swimming in three events: Solo, Duet  and Team.

Participating nations
12 nations swam at the 2002 Synchro World Cup:

Results

Point standings

References

FINA Synchronized Swimming World Cup
2002 in synchronized swimming
International aquatics competitions hosted by Switzerland
2002 in Swiss sport
Synchronised swimming in Switzerland